Parafia Ealing is a Polish Catholic church in Ealing. It is a Grade II listed building.

References

External links 

Grade II listed Roman Catholic churches in England
Churches in the London Borough of Ealing
Former Methodist churches in the United Kingdom
Buildings and structures completed in the 1860s
Roman Catholic churches in the London Borough of Ealing